Westwold is an unincorporated settlement in the Interior of British Columbia. A small farming and logging community, it is located between Kamloops and Vernon on Highway 97.  The original name for the settlement was "Grand Prairie", but this was changed in 1925 with the construction of a CNR spur line to Kelowna, to avoid a station name conflict.  Glacial tills near the townsite of Westwold have provided fossils from the Sangamonian Stage 130,000 years ago.

References

Unincorporated settlements in British Columbia
Populated places in the Thompson-Nicola Regional District